The Curve is a shopping mall in Mutiara Damansara, Petaling Jaya, Selangor, Malaysia.

Located in Mutiara Damansara, the Curve is accessible via 5 ways namely the North Klang Valley Expressway (NKVE), Lebuhraya Damansara Puchong (LDP), Sprint Highway (Penchala Link), Damansara Perdana and Persiaran Surian.

Basement parking bay is available for shoppers. (The Curve parking rate)

References

External links

 Official site

Petaling Jaya
Shopping malls in Selangor
Shopping malls established in 2005